Orlando Calisto de Souza or simply Calisto (born 18 December 1975) is a Brazilian former football left back.

Club career
He previously played for Russian Premier League side Rubin Kazan and Brazilian Série A club Vasco and Atlético Mineiro.

Honours
Alagoas State League: 2002

External links
 sambafoot
 netvasco

References

1975 births
People from Duque de Caxias, Rio de Janeiro
Sportspeople from Rio de Janeiro (state)
Living people
Brazilian footballers
Association football defenders
America Football Club (RJ) players
Associação Atlética Anapolina players
Clube de Regatas Brasil players
Sport Club Corinthians Alagoano players
Esporte Clube Bahia players
FC Rubin Kazan players
CR Vasco da Gama players
Clube Atlético Mineiro players
Botafogo Futebol Clube (PB) players
Olaria Atlético Clube players
Esporte Clube Juventude players
Audax Rio de Janeiro Esporte Clube players
Russian Premier League players
Campeonato Brasileiro Série A players
Campeonato Brasileiro Série D players
Brazilian expatriate footballers
Expatriate footballers in Russia
Brazilian expatriate sportspeople in Russia